|}

The Gordon Stakes is a Group 3 flat horse race in Great Britain open to three-year-old horses. It is run at Goodwood over a distance of 1 mile 3 furlongs and 218 yards (2,412 metres), and it is scheduled to take place each year in late July or early August.

History
The event is named after the Duke of Gordon, one of the dukedoms held by the Duke of Richmond, the owner of Goodwood Racecourse. It was established in 1902, and it was restricted to three-year-olds in 1903.

The Gordon Stakes can serve as a trial for the St. Leger Stakes, and nine horses have won both races. The first was Prince Palatine in 1911, and the latest was Conduit in 2008.

During the 1890s there was a 1 mile 2 furlong race open to three-year-olds and older called the Gordon Stakes that was run in late July or early August.

The race is currently held on the third day of the five-day Glorious Goodwood meeting.

Records

Leading jockey (6 wins):
 Sir Gordon Richards – Tavern (1933), Magnet (1936), Nathoo (1948), Royal Forest (1949), Prince d'Ouilly (1951), Gay Time (1952)
 Willie Carson – Grey Thunder (1974), More Light (1979), Prince Bee (1980), Bustomi (1981), Love the Groom (1987), Minster Son (1988)

Leading trainer (10 wins):
 Sir Michael Stoute – Electric (1982), Kazaroun (1985), Warrshan (1989), Alexius (2001), Maraahel (2004), Conduit (2008), Harbinger (2009), Snow Sky (2014), Ulysses (2016), Crystal Ocean (2017)

Winners since 1979

Earlier winners

 1902: Osbech
 1903: Zinfandel
 1904: Delaunay
 1905: Dinneford
 1906: Victorious
 1907: Galvani
 1908: Putchamin
 1909: Moscato
 1910: Cardinal Beaufort
 1911: Prince Palatine
 1912: Fantasio
 1913: Augur
 1914: My Prince
 1915–18: no race
 1919: Sir Douglas
 1920: The Alder
 1921: Stanislaus
 1922: Tamar
 1923: Bold and Bad
 1924: Black Sheep
 1925: Kentish Knock
 1926: Thistledown
 1927: Tiger Hill
 1928: Cyclonic
 1929: Defoe
 1930: Press Gang / Ut Majeur *
 1931: Rose en Soleil
 1932: Firdaussi
 1933: Tavern
 1934: Bright Bird
 1935: Bideford Bay
 1936: Magnet
 1937: Perifox
 1938: Valedictory
 1939: Wheatland
 1940–45: no race
 1946: Fast and Fair
 1947: Merry Quip
 1948: Nathoo
 1949: Royal Forest
 1950: Foxboro
 1951: Prince d'Ouilly
 1952: Gay Time
 1953: Prince Canarina
 1954: Brilliant Green
 1955: Manati
 1956: Dacian
 1957: Pipe of Peace
 1958: Guersillus
 1959: Above Suspicion
 1960: Kipling
 1961: Pardao
 1962: Gay Challenger
 1963: Tiger
 1964: Sweet Moss
 1965: King Log
 1966: Khalekan
 1967: Sun Rock
 1968: Mount Athos
 1969: Harmony Hall
 1970: Rock Roi
 1971: Athens Wood
 1972: Scottish Rifle
 1973: Duke of Ragusa
 1974: Grey Thunder
 1975: Guillaume Tell
 1976: Smuggler
 1977: Pollerton
 1978: Sexton Blake

* The 1930 race was a dead-heat and has joint winners.

See also
 Horse racing in Great Britain
 List of British flat horse races

References
 Paris-Turf: 
 Racing Post:

 galopp-sieger.de – Gordon Stakes.
 ifhaonline.org – International Federation of Horseracing Authorities – Gordon Stakes (2019).
 pedigreequery.com – Gordon Stakes – Goodwood.
 

Flat races in Great Britain
Goodwood Racecourse
Flat horse races for three-year-olds
Recurring sporting events established in 1902
1902 establishments in England